Causin may refer to:

 Andrea Causin, born 1972, an Italian politician
 John Causin, 1811-1861, American politician and congressman from Maryland
 Causin' Drama, a 2000 album by rapper Drama